Leesville is an unincorporated community in Lawrence County, Indiana, United States.

History
Leesville was founded in 1818. A majority of the early settlers being natives of Lee County, Virginia, caused the name to be selected.

References

Unincorporated communities in Lawrence County, Indiana
Unincorporated communities in Indiana